Decal may refer to:

 Decal, a sticker
 Ceramic decal
 Guitar decal
 Water slide decal
 Decalitre (decaL), a unit of volume in the metric system
 DeCal (Democratic Education at Cal), a student group at the University of California at Berkeley
 Decal texture, a texture/image overlaid on top of other textures in computer graphics
 Decal (software), plugin architecture for the Asheron's Call computer game
 Lick My Decals Off, Baby, the Captain Beefheart music album
 DECaLS, the Dark Energy Camera Legacy Survey
 Decal (company), an American film distribution company

See also